"Way Down in the Hole" is a song written by the singer-songwriter Tom Waits. It was included on his 1987 album Franks Wild Years, which was later made into a stage production.

The song was used as the theme for HBO's The Wire. A different recording was used each season. Versions, in series order, were recorded by The Blind Boys of Alabama, Tom Waits, The Neville Brothers, DoMaJe, and Steve Earle. Season four's version, performed by the Baltimore teenagers Ivan Ashford, Markel Steele, Cameron Brown, Tariq Al-Sabir and Avery Bargasse, was arranged and recorded specifically for the show. An extended version of the Blind Boys of Alabama recording was played over a montage in the series finale.

In 2004 a music historian, Kim Beissel, said that the 1994 song "Red Right Hand" by Nick Cave and the Bad Seeds was loosely based on this song by Waits.

References

1987 songs
Songs written by Tom Waits
Tom Waits songs
Television drama theme songs
The Wire